Leucopogon gracilis is a species of flowering plant in the heath family Ericaceae and is endemic to the south of Western Australia. It is a is a spindly shrub with wiry branchlets, linear to lance-shaped leaves, and dense spikes of white or pinkish flowers.

Description
The flowers are arranged in dense spikes on the ends of branches with small bracts and lance-shaped bracteoles about half as long as the sepals. Flowering occurs from July to December or from January to March.

Taxonomy
Leucopogon gracilis was first formally described in 1810 by Robert Brown in his Prodromus Florae Novae Hollandiae et Insulae Van Diemen. The specific epithet, (gracilis), means "slender" or "thin". A holotype, collected by Robert Brown at King George's Sound is kept at Kew Gardens.

References

gracilis
Ericales of Australia
Flora of Western Australia
Plants described in 1810
Taxa named by Robert Brown (botanist, born 1773)